Isheyevo (İşäy) is a rural locality (a selo) and the administrative centre of Isheyevsky Selsoviet, Ishimbaysky District, Bashkortostan, Russia. The population was 1,000 as of 2010. There are 14 streets.

Geography 
Isheyevo is located 28 km north of Ishimbay (the district's administrative centre) by road. Vostok is the nearest rural locality.

References 

Rural localities in Ishimbaysky District